A Thorn in the Bush is a thriller novel written by Frank Herbert and published posthumously in 2014.

Plot summary
Expatriate American Mrs. Ross is living a quiet life in San Juan, Mexico when an ambitious American painter arrives, determined to know everything there is to know about the small village. Mrs. Ross, however, is determined to go to whatever lengths necessary to hide the secrets of her previous life.

References

2014 American novels
American thriller novels
Novels by Frank Herbert
Novels published posthumously